Baye may refer to:

People
Baye (name)

Places
Baye, Finistère, France
Baye, Marne, France
Baye, Kayes, Mali
Baye, Mopti, Mali

See also
 Bay (disambiguation)
 Bayes (disambiguation)
 M'baye